Yogev Ohayon (born April 24, 1987) is an Israeli professional basketball player for Hapoel Holon of the Israeli Super League. He was the 2012 Israeli Basketball Premier League Finals MVP. He also represents the senior Israel national basketball team in international competitions. He is known as a skilled passer.

Professional career
Born in Safed, Israel, Ohayon started his career in Hapoel Galil Elyon, with whom he won the Israeli youth league championship. In the 2006–07 season, he led Hapoel Galil Elyon to the Israeli final four, with the team ultimately finishing in third place. In the 2007–08 season, Ohayon was the Ligat Winner's steals leader, with 2 steals per game. 

In July 2011, he signed a three-year deal with Maccabi Tel Aviv. He was the 2012 Israeli Basketball Premier League Finals MVP.

In the summer of 2012, Ohayon went to Russia for a medical test, before signing a contract with Lokomotiv Kuban, without informing Maccabi, with whom he still had a contract. Ohayon was not allowed to sign for any other team, before buying out his contract for around $200,000 USD. However, on September 19, 2012, FIBA ruled in favor of Maccabi Tel Aviv, after the team sued Ohayon through FIBA. If Ohayon wanted to leave Maccabi Tel Aviv, Lokomotiv Kuban would have to have reached an agreement on a buyout with his former club. Ohayon signed a new a deal with Maccabi instead, and agreed with them on a new three-year contract.

On July 9, 2017, Ohayon signed a three-year deal with Hapoel Jerusalem. In his second season with Jerusalem, he helped the team win the 2019 Israeli State Cup.

On July 7, 2019, Ohayon signed a two-year deal with Hapoel Holon, joining his former teammate Guy Pnini.

Career statistics

EuroLeague

|-
| style="text-align:left;"| 2011–12
| style="text-align:left;" rowspan=6| Maccabi
| 21 || 15 || 20.6 || .380 || .346 || .675 || 3.4 || 2.6 || 1.4 || .0 || 5.6 || 7.4
|-
| style="text-align:left;"| 2012–13
| 27 || 27 || 25.3 || .448 || .385 || .644 || 2.7 || 3.8 || 1.0 || .0 || 7.2 || 8.6
|-
| style="text-align:left;background:#AFE6BA;"| 2013–14†
| 27 || 23 || 20.5 || .442 || .383 || .737 || 2.0 || 3.2 || .8 || .1 || 5.7 || 6.8
|-
| style="text-align:left;"| 2014–15
| 26 || 23 || 25.1 || .359 || .379 || .563 || 3.1 || 3.8 || 1.4 || .1 || 5.5 || 7.7
|-
| style="text-align:left;"| 2015–16
| 10 || 6 || 18.6 || .365 || .250 || .909 || 1.9 || 2.9 || .6 || .1 || 5.3 || 3.6
|-
| style="text-align:left;"| 2016–17
| 27 || 10 || 17.9 || .404 || .440 || .655 || 1.7 || 2.7 || .9 || .1 || 5.3 || 5.7
|- class="sortbottom"
| style="text-align:left;"| Career
| style="text-align:left;"|
| 138 || 104 || 21.6 || .405 || .379 || .665 || 2.5 || 3.2 || 1.1 || .1 || 5.8 || 7

See also
List of select Jewish basketball players

References

External links
Yogev Ohayon at eurobasket.com
Yogev Ohayon at euroleague.net
Yogev Ohayon at fiba.com

1987 births
Living people
ABA League players
Hapoel Galil Elyon players
Hapoel Holon players
Hapoel Jerusalem B.C. players
Ironi Nahariya players
Israeli Basketball Premier League players
Jewish Israeli sportspeople
Israeli men's basketball players
Israeli people of Moroccan-Jewish descent
Jewish men's basketball players
Maccabi Tel Aviv B.C. players
People from Safed
Point guards